Ho sposato un calciatore (Italian for "I married a footballer") is a 2005 Italian television mini series written and directed by Stefano Sollima. It was broadcast on Canale 5, and is based on the UK serial Footballers' Wives.

Main cast
 Paolo Seganti as Bruno Caracci
 Jane Alexander as  Tonia Caracci
 Karin Proia as Anna Palma
  Edoardo Leo as  Vito Palma
 Maria Elena Vandone as Crystal Ferrari
 Mirko Petrini as Luca Martelli
 Frank Crudele as Carmine Caradia
  David Sef as  Jorge Vildoza
 Benedetta Valanzano as  Miriam Bove
  Gea Lionello as  Veronica Torre
 Stefania Rivi as  Monica Ballini
 Edoardo Siravo as Peppe Perego
 Caterina Vertova as  Linda Martelli
  Valerio Aprea as Gualtiero
 Simona Borioni as  Marcella Basile
  Aurora Cancian as  Fiorenza Messeri
 Simona Caparrini as  Gina
  Martina Disposti as  Marika Palma
  Marco Di Stefano  as  Paolo Mastrangelo
 Antonella Interlenghi as  Regina Caradia
 Maria Monsè as  Alessia
 Lorenzo Renzi as  Raffaele Brasca
 Alessandro Tiberi as  Mattia Covelli
 Costantino Vitagliano as  Guido Ballini

References

External links
 
 

2000s Italian-language films
Italian television films
2000s Italian television series
Association football television series